World War II in Colour is a 13-episode British television docuseries recounting the major events of World War II narrated by Robert Powell. It was first broadcast in 2008–2009. The series is in full colour, combining both original and colourized footage. The show covers the Western Front, Eastern Front, North African Campaign and the Pacific War. It was on syndication in the United States on the Military Channel.

Episodes

Thirties in Colour: Countdown to War
In 2021, Channel 5 broadcast a sister series on their 5Select channel called Thirties in Colour: Countdown to War, which would be replaced in the schedules by the 2009 series in September 2021, once the new programme had got to the point of war in its timeline. Not to be confused with the 2008 BBC Four programme The Thirties in Colour which looked at the work of documentarians Rosie Newman and Harry Wright, this series featured colourised footage of politicians, newsmakers and other important people from the 1930s (like Amy Johnson, the first woman to fly solo from Britain to Australia, and Ellen Wilkinson MP, who was involved with the Jarrow unemployment march), which was interspersed with modern-day comments and insights from historians, plus an onscreen counter ticking down to the declaration of war.

See also
World War 1 in Colour

References

External links
 APT Online
 

World War II television documentaries
Documentary television series about World War II
American Heroes Channel original programming
2008 American television series debuts